Ronald Frederick Edwards (born 2 July 1945) is a retired Australian politician. Born in Perth, Western Australia, he was educated at the University of Western Australia and the University of Sydney, after which he became a lecturer in economics and industrial relations. In 1983, he was elected to the Australian House of Representatives as the Labor member for Stirling, defeating the sitting member, Liberal minister Ian Viner. Edwards held Stirling until his defeat by Liberal candidate Eoin Cameron in 1993.

Early life
Edwards was born on 2 July 1945 in West Midland, Western Australia. He was the second of two children born to Daphne and Norman Frederick Edwards; his father was an engine driver. He was educated at Governor Stirling Senior High School, going on to complete a Bachelor of Education at the University of Western Australia in 1966.

In 1966, Edwards moved to Canberra to become an administrative trainee with the Public Service Board. He then moved to Sydney where he was a research officer with the Department of Labour and National Service from 1967 to 1970. He later taught economics and industrial relations at Sydney Technical College and was then head of social sciences at the New South Wales Department of Technical Education. In 1976, Edwards returned to Western Australia and settled in the suburb of Trigg. He became a lecturer in economics and industrial relations at the Churchlands College of Advanced Education, also completing a Master of Education degree at the University of Sydney by correspondence in 1983.

Politics
Edwards was Deputy Speaker and Chairman of Committees from 29 August 1989 to 8 February 1993. During his term in office the position was renamed from just "Chairman of Committees". Just prior to the calling of the 1993 federal election, Speaker Leo McLeay resigned. It had been expected that if the election had not been called so soon after McLeay's resignation as Speaker or if Edwards had held his seat in the election upon the re-election of the Keating Government, Edwards would have been elected Speaker.

Other activities
Edwards is the co-founder and board member of The Graham (Polly) Farmer Foundation, an educational not-for-profit founded in 1995.

References

Australian Labor Party members of the Parliament of Australia
Members of the Australian House of Representatives for Stirling
Members of the Australian House of Representatives
1945 births
Living people
20th-century Australian politicians
University of Western Australia alumni
University of Sydney alumni
Australian educators
Academic staff of Edith Cowan University
People educated at Governor Stirling Senior High School